Black Douglas may refer to:

People
 James Douglas, Lord of Douglas, companion in arms of Robert I of Scotland
 Archibald Douglas, 3rd Earl of Douglas, called Archibald the Grim or Black Archibalde (c. 1330 – c. 1400), 3rd Earl of Douglas
 Any Earl of Douglas until their forfeiture in 1455

Others
 British Rail Class 87 locomotive 87030 built 1974
 , a ship built in 1930
 The Black Douglas (novel), by S. R. Crockett